The 2008 Nordea Danish Open was a women's professional tennis event on the 2008 ITF Women's Circuit, which took place from 17 to 23 November. The event was hosted in Odense, Denmark. It was played on indoor carpet courts. The total prize money offered at this tournament was US$100,000.

The tournament was only played in 2008. The WTA tournament 2010 e-Boks Danish Open in Copenhagen may be viewed as a continuation.

Entrants

Seeds

Rankings are as of November 11, 2008

Other entrants
The following players received wildcards into the main draw:
  Karen Barbat
  Malou Ejdesgaard
  Hanne Skak Jensen
  Emma Laine

The following players received entry from the qualifying draw:
  Sarah Borwell
  Lenka Juríková
  Michaëlla Krajicek
  Tatjana Malek

The following players received entry through the lucky loser spot:
  Dia Evtimova
  Anna Smith
  Jasmina Tinjić
  Pauline Wong

The following players entered via a protected ranking:
  Andrea Petkovic

Champions

Singles

  Caroline Wozniacki def.  Sofia Arvidsson, 6–2, 6–1

Doubles

  Sarah Borwell /  Courtney Nagle def.  Gabriela Chmelinová /  Mervana Jugić-Salkić, 6–4, 6–4

References
 https://www.itftennis.com/en/tournament/$100000-odense/den/2008/w-witf-den-01a-2008/draws-and-results/

Nordea Danish Open
Tennis in Denmark
Tennis tournaments in Denmark
2008 in Danish tennis